Laura Elizabeth Ingalls Wilder (February 7, 1867 – February 10, 1957) was an American writer, mostly known for the Little House on the Prairie series of children's books, published between 1932 and 1943, which were based on her childhood in a settler and pioneer family.

The television series Little House on the Prairie (1974–1983) was loosely based on the books, and starred Melissa Gilbert as Laura and Michael Landon as her father, Charles Ingalls.

Birth and ancestry

Laura Elizabeth Ingalls was born to Charles Phillip and Caroline Lake (née Quiner) Ingalls on February 7, 1867.  At the time of Ingalls' birth, the family lived seven miles north of the village of Pepin, Wisconsin, in the Big Woods region of Wisconsin. Ingalls' home in Pepin became the setting for her first book, Little House in the Big Woods (1932).  She was the second of five children, following older sister, Mary Amelia. Three more children would follow, Caroline Celestia (Carrie), Charles Frederick, who died in infancy, and Grace Pearl. Ingalls Wilder's birth site is commemorated by a replica log cabin at the Little House Wayside in Pepin.

Ingalls was a descendant of the Delano family, the ancestral family of U.S. President Franklin Delano Roosevelt. One paternal ancestor, Edmund Ingalls, from Skirbeck, Lincolnshire, England, emigrated to America, settling in Lynn, Massachusetts.

Laura was the 7th great granddaughter of the Mayflower passenger Richard Warren. She was a third cousin, once removed, of U.S. President and Civil War General Ulysses S. Grant.

Early life
When she was two years old, Ingalls Wilder moved with her family from Wisconsin in 1869. After stopping in Rothville, Missouri, they settled in the Indian country of Kansas, near modern-day Independence, Kansas. Her younger sister, Carrie, was born in Independence in August 1870, not long before they moved again. According to Ingalls Wilder, her father Charles Ingalls had been told that the location would be open to white settlers, but when they arrived this was not the case. The Ingalls family had no legal right to occupy their homestead because it was on the Osage Indian reservation. They had just begun to farm when they heard rumors that settlers would be evicted, so they left in the spring of 1871. Although in her novel, Little House on the Prairie, and Pioneer Girl memoir, Ingalls Wilder portrayed their departure as being prompted by rumors of eviction, she also noted that her parents needed to recover their Wisconsin land because the buyer had not paid the mortgage.

The Ingalls family went back to Wisconsin where they lived for the next three years. Those experiences formed the basis for Wilder's novels Little House in the Big Woods (1932) and the beginning of Little House on the Prairie (1935).

On the Banks of Plum Creek (1939), the third volume of her fictionalized history which takes place around 1874, the Ingalls family moves from Kansas to an area near Walnut Grove, Minnesota, settling in a dugout on the banks of Plum Creek.  They moved there from Wisconsin when Ingalls was about seven years old, after briefly living with the family of her uncle, Peter Ingalls, first in Wisconsin and then on rented land near Lake City, Minnesota. In Walnut Grove, the family first lived in a dugout sod house on a preemption claim; after wintering in it, they moved into a new house built on the same land. Two summers of ruined crops led them to move to Iowa. On the way, they stayed again with Charles Ingalls' brother, Peter Ingalls, this time on his farm near South Troy, Minnesota. Her brother, Charles Frederick Ingalls ("Freddie"), was born there on November 1, 1875, dying nine months later in August 1876. In Burr Oak, Iowa, the family helped run a hotel. The youngest of the Ingalls children, Grace, was born there on May 23, 1877.

The family moved from Burr Oak back to Walnut Grove where Charles Ingalls served as the town butcher and justice of the peace. He accepted a railroad job in the spring of 1879, which took him to eastern Dakota Territory, where they joined him that fall. Ingalls Wilder omitted the period in 1876–1877 when they lived near Burr Oak, skipping to Dakota Territory, portrayed in By the Shores of Silver Lake (1939).

De Smet

Wilder's father filed for a formal homestead over the winter of 1879–1880. De Smet, South Dakota became home for her parents and her blind sister Mary for the remainder of their lives. After spending the mild winter of 1879–1880 in the surveyor's house, they watched the town of De Smet rise up from the prairie in 1880. The following winter, 1880–1881, one of the most severe on record in the Dakotas, was later described by Ingalls Wilder in her novel, The Long Winter (1940). Once the family was settled in De Smet, Ingalls attended school, worked several part-time jobs, and made friends. Among them was bachelor homesteader Almanzo Wilder. This time in her life is documented in the books Little Town on the Prairie (1941) and These Happy Golden Years (1943).

Young teacher
On December 10, 1882, two months before her 16th birthday, Ingalls accepted her first teaching position. She taught three terms in one-room schools when she was not attending school in De Smet. (In Little Town on the Prairie she receives her first teaching certificate on December 24, 1882, but that was an enhancement for dramatic effect.) Her original "Third Grade" teaching certificate can be seen on page 25 of William Anderson's book Laura's Album (1998). She later admitted she did not particularly enjoy it, but felt a responsibility from a young age to help her family financially, and wage-earning opportunities for women were limited. Between 1883 and 1885, she taught three terms of school, worked for the local dressmaker, and attended high school, although she did not graduate. (According to the books, this was due to her first teaching job starting before her schooling finished.)

Early marriage years

Ingalls' teaching career and studies ended when the 18-year-old Laura married 28-year-old Almanzo Wilder on August 25, 1885, in De Smet, South Dakota. From the beginning of their relationship, the pair had nicknames for each other: she called him "Manly" and he called her "Bess," from her middle name Elizabeth, to avoid confusion with his sister, who was also named Laura. Almanzo had achieved a degree of prosperity on his homestead claim; the newly married couple started their life together in a new home, north of De Smet.

On December 5, 1886, Wilder gave birth to her daughter, Rose.  In 1889, she gave birth to a son who died at 12 days of age before being named. He was buried at De Smet, Kingsbury County, South Dakota. On the grave marker, he is remembered as "Baby Son of A. J. Wilder."

Their first few years of marriage were difficult. Complications from a life-threatening bout of diphtheria in 1888 left Almanzo partially paralyzed. Although he eventually regained nearly full use of his legs, he needed a cane to walk for the remainder of his life. This setback, among many others, began a series of unfortunate events that included the death of their newborn son, the destruction of their barn along with its hay and grain by a mysterious fire, the total loss of their home from a fire accidentally set by Rose, and several years of severe drought that left them in debt, physically ill, and unable to earn a living from their 320 acres (129.5 hectares) of prairie land. These trials were documented in Wilder's book The First Four Years (published in 1971). Around 1890, they left De Smet and spent about a year resting at the home of Almanzo's parents on their Spring Valley, Minnesota, farm before moving briefly to Westville, Florida, in search of a climate to improve Almanzo's health. They found, however, that the dry plains they were used to were very different from the humidity they encountered in Westville. The weather, along with feeling out of place among the locals, encouraged their return to De Smet in 1892, where they purchased a small home.

Move to Mansfield, Missouri

In 1894, the Wilders moved to Mansfield, Missouri, and used their savings to make the down payment on an undeveloped property just outside town. They named the place Rocky Ridge Farm and moved into a ramshackle log cabin. At first, they earned income only from wagon loads of fire wood they would sell in town for 50 cents.  Financial security came slowly. Apple trees they planted did not bear fruit for seven years. Almanzo's parents visited around that time and gave them the deed to the house they had been renting in Mansfield, which was the economic boost Wilder's family needed. They then added to the property outside town, and eventually accrued nearly 200 acres (80.9 hectares). Around 1910, they sold the house in town, moved back to the farm, and completed the farmhouse with the proceeds. What began as about 40 acres (16.2 hectares) of thickly wooded, stone-covered hillside with a windowless log cabin became in 20 years a relatively prosperous poultry, dairy, and fruit farm, and a 10-room farmhouse.

The Wilders had learned from cultivating wheat as their sole crop in De Smet. They diversified Rocky Ridge Farm with poultry, a dairy farm, and a large apple orchard. Wilder became active in various clubs and was an advocate for several regional farm associations. She was recognized as an authority in poultry farming and rural living, which led to invitations to speak to groups around the region.

Writing career
An invitation to submit an article to the Missouri Ruralist in 1911 led to Wilder's permanent position as a columnist and editor with that publication, which she held until the mid-1920s. She also took a paid position with the local Farm Loan Association, dispensing small loans to local farmers.

Wilder's column in the Ruralist, "As a Farm Woman Thinks," introduced her to a loyal audience of rural Ozarkians, who enjoyed her regular columns. Her topics ranged from home and family, including her 1915 trip to San Francisco, California to visit her now-married daughter, Rose Wilder Lane, and see the Pan-Pacific exhibition, to World War I and other world events, and to the fascinating world travels of Lane as well as her own thoughts on the increasing options offered to women during this era. While the couple were never wealthy until the "Little House" books began to achieve popularity, the farming operation and Wilder's income from writing and the Farm Loan Association provided them with a stable living.

"[By] 1924", according to the Professor John E. Miller, "[a]fter more than a decade of writing for farm papers, Wilder had become a disciplined writer, able to produce thoughtful, readable prose for a general audience." 

Around this time her daughter, Lane, began intensively encouraging Wilder to improve her writing skills with a view toward greater success as a writer than Lane had already achieved.  The Wilders, according to Miller, had come to "[depend] on annual income subsidies from their increasingly famous and successful daughter." They both had concluded that the solution for improving their retirement income was for Wilder to become a successful writer herself. As a start, Lane helped Wilder publish two articles describing the interior of the farmhouse, in Country Gentleman magazine. However, the "project never proceeded very far."

In 1928, Lane hired out the construction of an English-style stone cottage for her parents on property adjacent to the farmhouse they had personally built and still inhabited. She remodeled and took it over.

The Stock Market Crash of 1929 wiped the Wilders out; Lane's investments were devastated as well. They still owned the 200-acre (81-hectare) farm, but they had invested most of their savings with Lane's broker. 

In 1930, Wilder requested Lane's opinion about an autobiographical manuscript she had written about her pioneering childhood. The Great Depression, coupled with the deaths of Wilder's mother in 1924 and her older sister in 1928, seem to have prompted her to preserve her memories in a life story called Pioneer Girl. She also hoped that her writing would generate some additional income. 

The original title of the first of the books was When Grandma Was a Little Girl. On the advice of Lane's publisher, she greatly expanded the story. As a result of Lane's publishing connections as a successful writer and after editing by her, Harper & Brothers published Wilder's book in 1932 as Little House in the Big Woods. After its success, she continued writing. The close and often rocky collaboration between her and Lane continued, in person until 1935, when Lane permanently left Rocky Ridge Farm, and afterward by correspondence.

The collaboration worked both ways: two of Lane's most successful novels, Let the Hurricane Roar (1932) and Free Land (1938), were written at the same time as the "Little House" series and basically retold Ingalls and Wilder family tales in an adult format.

Little House books 

 Little House in the Big Woods
 Farmer Boy
 Little House on the Prairie
 On the Banks of Plum Creek
 By the Shores of Silver Lake
 The Long Winter
 Little Town on the Prairie
 These Happy Golden Years
 The First Four Years

Authorship controversy
Some, including Lane's biographer William Holtz, have alleged that Wilder's daughter was her ghostwriter.  Existing evidence including ongoing correspondence between the women about the books' development, Lane's extensive diaries, and Wilder's handwritten manuscripts with edit notations shows an ongoing collaboration between the two women.

Miller, using this record, describes varying levels of involvement by Lane. Little House in the Big Woods (1932) and These Happy Golden Years (1943), he notes, received the least editing. "The first pages...and other large sections of [Big Woods]," he observes, "stand largely intact, indicating...from the start...[Laura's] talent for narrative description."  Some volumes saw heavier participation by Lane, while The First Four Years (1971) appears to be exclusively a Wilder work.
Miller concludes that, "[i]n the end, the lasting literary legacy remains that of the mother more than that of the daughter.... Lane possessed style; Wilder had substance."

The controversy over authorship is often tied to the movement to read the Little House series through an ideological lens. Lane emerged in the 1930s as an avowed conservative polemicist and critic of the Franklin D. Roosevelt administration and his New Deal programs. According to a 2012 article in the New Yorker, "When Roosevelt was elected, she noted in her diary, 'America has a dictator.' She prayed for his assassination, and considered doing the job herself." Whatever Lane's politics, "attacks on [Wilder's] authorship seem aimed at infusing her books with ideological passions they just don't have."

On the topic of historical fiction and its influence on modern views of race relations, literary scholar Rachelle Kuehl notes that Laura Ingalls Wilder’s Little House series has received backlash for her problematic portrayal of Native Americans. They have also been the subject of postcolonial writing including Kathy Jetnil-Kijiner's "To Laura Ingalls Wilder" included in her 2017 collection Iep Jaltok: Poems from a Marshallese Daughter.

Enduring appeal
The original Little House books, written for elementary school–age children, became an enduring, eight-volume record of pioneering life late in the 19th century based on the Ingalls family's experiences on the American frontier. As Irene Smith pointed out shortly after "These Happy Golden Years (1943) was published, Wilder  began "with a style appealing to the eight-year-olds and continuing in volumes of increasing length and difficulty. This graduation is a distinguishing feature of the Little House books." The First Four Years, about the early days of the Wilder marriage, was discovered by her literary executor Roger MacBride after Lane's 1968 death and published in 1971, unedited by Lane or MacBride. It is now marketed as the ninth volume.

Since the publication of Little House in the Big Woods (1932), the books have been continuously in print and have been translated into 40 other languages. Wilder's first—and smallest—royalty check from Harper, in 1932, was for $500, . By the mid-1930s the royalties from the Little House books brought a steady and increasingly substantial income to the Wilders for the first time in their 50 years of marriage. The collaboration also brought the two writers at Rocky Ridge Farm the money they needed to recoup the loss of their investments in the stock market. Various honors, huge amounts of fan mail, and other accolades were bestowed on Wilder.

Autobiography: Pioneer Girl
In 1929–1930, already in her early 60s, Wilder began writing her autobiography, titled Pioneer Girl. It was rejected by publishers. At Lane's urging, she rewrote most of her stories for children. The result was the Little House series of books. In 2014, the South Dakota State Historical Society published an annotated version of Wilder's autobiography, titled Pioneer Girl: The Annotated Autobiography.

Pioneer Girl includes stories that Wilder felt were inappropriate for children: e.g., a man accidentally immolating himself while drunk, and an incident of extreme violence of a local shopkeeper against his wife, which ended with his setting their house on fire. She also describes previously unknown facets of her father's character. According to its publisher, "Wilder's fiction, her autobiography, and her real childhood are all distinct things, but they are closely intertwined." The book's aim was to explore the differences, including incidents with conflicting or non-existing accounts in one or another of the sources.

Political views
Wilder has been referred to by some as one of America's first libertarians. She was a longtime Democrat, but became dismayed with Roosevelt's New Deal and what she and her daughter, Rose Wilder Lane, saw as Americans' increasing dependence on the federal government. Wilder grew disenchanted with her party and resented government agents who came to farms like hers and grilled farmers about the number of acres they were planting. Her daughter was similarly a strong libertarian.

Wilder supported women's rights (though she worried that women would vote according to what their husbands wanted, and not as they wanted) and education reform. She also became infamous for a short period for shaking the hand of an African American man, which was controversial for segregated Missouri. Indeed, part of the plot of Little House on the Prairie involves an African American doctor saving the Ingalls family's lives.

Later life and death
Upon Lane's departure from Rocky Ridge Farm, Laura and Almanzo moved back into the farmhouse they had built, which had most recently been occupied by friends.  From 1935 on, they were alone at Rocky Ridge Farm. Most of the surrounding area (including the property with the stone cottage Lane had built for them) was sold, but they still kept some farm animals, and tended their flower beds and vegetable gardens. Almost daily, carloads of fans stopped by, eager to meet the "Laura" of the Little House books.

The Wilders lived independently and without financial worries until Almanzo's death at the farm in 1949 at age 92. Wilder remained on the farm. For the next eight years, she lived alone, looked after by a circle of neighbors and friends. She continued an active correspondence with her editors, fans, and friends during these years.

In autumn 1956, 89-year-old Wilder became severely ill from undiagnosed diabetes and cardiac issues. She was hospitalized by Lane, who had arrived for Thanksgiving. She was able to return home on the day after Christmas.  However, her health declined after her release from the hospital, and she died at home in her sleep on February 10, 1957, three days after her 90th birthday. She was buried beside Almanzo at Mansfield Cemetery in Mansfield. Lane was buried next to them upon her death in 1968.

Estate
Following Wilder's death, possession of Rocky Ridge Farm passed to the farmer who had earlier bought the property under a life lease arrangement. The local population put together a non-profit corporation to purchase the house and its grounds for use as a museum. After some wariness at the notion of seeing the house rather than the books be a shrine to Wilder, Lane came to believe that making a museum of it would draw long-lasting attention to the books. She donated the money needed to purchase the house and make it a museum, agreed to make significant contributions each year for its upkeep, and donated many of her parents' belongings.

In compliance with Wilder's will, Lane inherited ownership of the Little House literary estate, with the stipulation that it be for only her lifetime, with all rights reverting to the Mansfield library after her death. Following her demise in 1968, however, her chosen heir, Roger MacBride, gained control of the books' copyrights. as well as her business agent and lawyer. The copyrights to each of Wilder's "Little House" books, as well as those of Lane's own literary works, were renewed in his name after the original copyright had expired.

Controversy arose following MacBride's death in 1995, when the Laura Ingalls Wilder Branch of the Wright County Library in Mansfield—the library founded in part by Wilder—tried to recover the rights to the series. The ensuing court case was settled in an undisclosed manner, with MacBride's heirs retaining the rights to Wilder's books. From the settlement, the library received enough to start work on a new building.

The popularity of the Little House books has grown over the years following Wilder's death, spawning a multimillion-dollar franchise of mass merchandising under MacBride's impetus. Results of the franchise have included additional spinoff book series—some written by MacBride and his daughter, Abigail—and the long-running television series, starring Melissa Gilbert as Wilder and Michael Landon as her father.

Works 

Because she died in 1957, Wilder's works are now public domain in countries where the term of copyright lasts 50 years after the author's death, or less; generally this does not include works first published posthumously. Works first published before 1924 or where copyright was not renewed, primarily her newspaper columns, are also public domain in the United States.

Little House books
The eight "original" Little House books were published by Harper & Brothers with illustrations by Helen Sewell (the first three) or by Sewell and Mildred Boyle.
 Little House in the Big Woods (1932)named to the inaugural Lewis Carroll Shelf Award list in 1958
 Farmer Boy (1933)about Almanzo Wilder growing up in New York
 Little House on the Prairie (1935)
 On the Banks of Plum Creek (1937)
 By the Shores of Silver Lake (1939)
 The Long Winter (1940)
 Little Town on the Prairie (1941)
 These Happy Golden Years (1943)

Other works
 On the Way Home (1962, published posthumously)diary of the Wilders' move from De Smet, South Dakota, to Mansfield, Missouri, edited and supplemented by Rose Wilder Lane
 The First Four Years (1971, published posthumously by Harper & Row), illustrated by Garth Williamscommonly considered the ninth Little House book
 West from Home (1974, published posthumously), ed. Roger Lea MacBrideWilder's letters to Almanzo while visiting her daughter Rose Wilder-Lane in 1915 in San Francisco
 Little House in the Ozarks: The Rediscovered Writings (1991) collection of pre-1932 articles
 The Road Back Home, part three (the only part previously unpublished) of A Little House Traveler: Writings from Laura Ingalls Wilder's Journeys Across America (2006, Harper) Wilder's record of a 1931 trip with Almanzo to De Smet, South Dakota, and the Black Hills

 A Little House Sampler (1988 or 1989, U. of Nebraska), with Rose Wilder Lane, ed. William Anderson, 
 Writings to Young WomenVolume One: On Wisdom and Virtues, Volume Two: On Life as a Pioneer Woman, Volume Three: As Told by Her Family, Friends, and Neighbors
 A Little House Reader: A Collection of Writings (1998, Harper), ed. William Anderson
 Laura Ingalls Wilder & Rose Wilder Lane, 1937–1939 (1992, Herbert Hoover Presidential Library), ed. Timothy Walchselections from letters exchanged by Wilder and Lane, with family photographs, 
 Laura's Album: A Remembrance Scrapbook of Laura Ingalls Wilder (1998, Harper), ed. William Anderson, 
 Pioneer Girl: The Annotated Autobiography (South Dakota Historical Society Press, 2014)
 Before the Prairie Books: The Writings of Laura Ingalls Wilder 1911–1916: The Small Farm
 Before the Prairie Books: The Writings of Laura Ingalls Wilder 1917–1918: The War Years
 Before the Prairie Books: The Writings of Laura Ingalls Wilder 1919–1920: The Farm Home
 Before the Prairie Books: The Writings of Laura Ingalls Wilder 1921–1924: A Farm Woman
 Laura Ingalls Wilder's Most Inspiring Writings
 Laura Ingalls Wilder: A Pioneer Girl's World View: Selected Newspaper Columns (Little House Prairie Series)
 The Selected Letters of Laura Ingalls Wilder, edited by William Anderson
 Laura Ingalls Wilder Farm Journalist: Writings from the Ozarks, edited by Stephen W. Hines
 Laura Ingalls Wilder's Fairy Poems, Introduced and compiled by Stephen W. Hines

Legacy

Documentary

Little House on the Prairie: The Legacy of Laura Ingalls Wilder (February 2015) is a one-hour documentary film that looks at the life of Wilder. Wilder's story as a writer, wife, and mother is explored through interviews with scholars and historians, archival photography, paintings by frontier artists, and dramatic reenactments.

Historic sites and museums

 Laura Ingalls Wilder House and Museum, Mansfield, Missouri
 Laura Ingalls Wilder Museum, Pepin, Wisconsin
 Laura Ingalls Wilder Museum, Walnut Grove, Minnesota
 Laura Ingalls Wilder Memorial Society museum and historic homes, De Smet, South Dakota;  annual pageant performed here
 Laura Ingalls Wilder Park and Museum, Burr Oak, Iowa
 Little House on the Prairie Museum, Independence, Kansas
 Wilder Homestead, Malone, NY
 De Smet Cemetery in Kingsbury County, South Dakota, where many Little House Ingalls family members are buried

Portrayals on screen and stage
Multiple adaptations of Wilder's Little House on the Prairie book series have been produced for screen and stage. In them, the following actresses have portrayed Wilder:
 Melissa Gilbert in the television series Little House on the Prairie and its movie sequels (1974–1984)
 Kazuko Sugiyama (voice) in the Japanese anime series Laura, The Prairie Girl (1975–1976)
 Meredith Monroe, Tess Harper (elder version), Alandra Bingham (younger version, part 1), Michelle Bevan (younger version, part 2) in part 1 and part 2 of the Beyond the Prairie: The True Story of Laura Ingalls Wilder television films (2000 and 2002)
 Kyle Chavarria in the TV miniseries Little House on the Prairie (2005)
 Kara Lindsay in the Little House on the Prairie book musical (2008–2010)

Wilder Medal

Wilder was five times a runner-up for the annual Newbery Medal, the premier American Library Association (ALA) book award for children's literature. In 1954, the ALA inaugurated a lifetime achievement award for children's writers and illustrators, named for Wilder, of which she was the first recipient. The Laura Ingalls Wilder Medal recognizes a living author or illustrator whose books, published in the United States, have made "a substantial and lasting contribution to literature for children". As of 2013, it has been conferred nineteen times, biennially starting in 2001. In 2018, the award was renamed the Children's Literature Legacy Award in light of language in Wilder's works which the Association perceived as biased against Native Americans and African Americans.

Other
 Google Doodle commemorated her 148th birthday in 2015.
 Hall of Famous Missourians at the Missouri State Capitola bronze bust depicting Wilder is on permanent display in the rotunda. She was inducted in 1993.
 Missouri Walk of FameWilder was honored on the Walk in 2006.
 Wilder crater on the planet Venus was named after Wilder.
 The Wilder Life: My Adventures in the Lost World of ‘Little House on the Prairie’, 2011 book by Wendy McClure

See also

References

Notes

Citations

Works cited
 
  – Edition: illustrated, reprint, revised; 427 pp.; selections and bibliographic data retrieved from Google Books 2015-10-15.

Further reading

External links

 Laura Ingalls Wilder in MNopedia, the Minnesota Encyclopedia
 
 Beyond Little House – Laura Ingalls Wilder Legacy and Research Association
 Laura Ingalls Wilder, Frontier Girl
 Travel map of Laura Ingalls Wilder – A map showing Laura Ingalls Wilder's travels from her birth in 1867 to 1894.
 About the Ingalls Family (Sarah S. Uthoff)
 Western American Literature Research: Laura Ingalls Wilder
 Laura Ingalls Wilder: An American Fixture (Pamela Smith Hill)

Museums
 Laura Ingalls Wilder Museum, Walnut Grove, Minnesota:
 Laura Ingalls Wilder Park & Museum, Burr Oak, Iowa

Electronic editions
 

 
1867 births
1957 deaths
20th-century American novelists
20th-century American women writers
20th-century Congregationalists
American children's writers
American Congregationalists
American libertarians
American pioneers
American people of English descent
Schoolteachers from South Dakota
American women educators
American women novelists
Christian libertarians
Cowgirl Hall of Fame inductees
Deaths from diabetes
Delano family
Ingalls family
Laura Ingalls Wilder Medal winners
Newbery Honor winners
Novelists from Missouri
Novelists from Wisconsin
People from De Smet, South Dakota
People from Pepin, Wisconsin
People from Wright County, Missouri
Wilder family
American women children's writers
Novelists from South Dakota
Burials in Missouri